A laying worker bee is a worker bee that lays unfertilized eggs, usually in the absence of a queen bee. Only drones develop from the eggs of laying worker bees (with some exceptions, see thelytoky). A beehive cannot survive with only a laying worker bee.

Prevalence
Even in a normal hive, about 1% of workers have ovaries developed enough to lay eggs. However the usual number of the laid eggs is very small. Only eight eggs (seven moderately and one fully developed) were found after examining of 10,634 worker bees (strong colony contains about 100,000). Workers eventually lay significant numbers of eggs only in queenless colonies.

Development
Laying workers develop in the absence of open brood as produced by a healthy adult queen. Normally, pheromones from the brood – known as brood recognition pheromones – prevent development of the workers' ovaries.  Laying workers can develop after the colony's queen has been lost to swarming, or in the presence of a failing queen which has yet to be superseded. The process of developing a laying worker usually takes weeks after the loss of the original queen. In adult laying workers there is an anatomic (and physiological) trade-off between the sizes of their more developed ovaries and their less developed food glands.

Identification
All methods of identifying a laying worker bee involve inspection, in which the beekeeper examines the brood pattern and type to identify if a healthy queen is present, or a potential laying worker. The beekeeper looks for diagnostic signs, including:
Brood patternLaying workers lay eggs that lack the queen's egg recognition pheromone, meaning that other workers may remove the eggs. This results in a spotty brood pattern, in which empty cells are scattered heavily through capped brood.
Number of eggs per cell The beekeeper looks at the honeycomb cells to see how many eggs are laid in each one. Queen bees will usually lay only a single egg to a cell, but laying workers will lay multiple eggs per cell. Multiple eggs per cell are not an absolute sign of a laying worker because when a newly mated queen begins laying, she may lay more than one egg per cell.
Egg positionEgg position in the cell is a good indicator of a laying worker.  A queen bee's abdomen is noticeably longer than a worker, allowing a queen to lay an egg at the bottom of the cell.  A queen bee will usually lay an egg centered in the cell. Workers cannot reach the bottom of normal depth cells, and will lay eggs on the sides of the cell or off center.
Drone brood in worker cellsAnother good indicator is drone brood in worker sized cells. Drones are raised in larger cells than workers. Drone cells are recognizable by their larger size; and when capped, drone cells are capped with blunt pointed cappings. Drones in worker cells are a sure sign of a failing queen or laying worker.

References 

Bees
Beekeeping